Marr Paterson was a Scottish professional footballer who played as a forward for Leith Athletic and The Wednesday.

Personal life 
While a The Wednesday player, Paterson shared accommodation in Sheffield with teammate Jimmy Campbell. He worked for the British Government during the First World War.

Career statistics

References

Scottish footballers
English Football League players
Sheffield Wednesday F.C. players
Leith Athletic F.C. players
Scottish Football League players

1887 births
Year of death missing
Place of death missing
Sportspeople from Clackmannanshire
Association football forwards
Association football inside forwards
British people of World War I